Micrurus ornatissimus is a species of coral snake in the family Elapidae. Specimens have been identified in the Andean regions of Ecuador, Colombia, and Peru. "Ornatissimus" is Latin for "very ornate".

References 

ornatissimus
Snakes of South America
Reptiles of Ecuador
Reptiles of Colombia
Reptiles of Peru
Reptiles described in 1858